Lists of Scottish cricketers include:

 List of Scotland national cricket captains
 List of Scotland ODI cricketers
 List of Scotland women ODI cricketers
 List of Scotland Twenty20 International cricketers
 List of Scotland women Twenty20 International cricketers
 List of Scottish cricket and football players

See also
 Lists of English cricketers

Lists of Scottish cricketers